Spanish tennis player Rafael Nadal's fourteen French Open titles hold numerous records in the all-time and Open Era records for the sport with his longtime rival Roger Federer calling it 'one of the greatest achievements in sport'. His most recent title came at the 2022 edition in which he defeated Casper Ruud in the final.

Overview

Titles

Finals: 14 (14 titles)

Statistics

Head-to-head records
Players in bold were ranked inside the top 10 at the time of at least one meeting.

 Novak Djokovic 8–2
 Robin Söderling 3–1
 Roger Federer 6–0
 David Ferrer 4–0
 Dominic Thiem 4–0
 Diego Schwartzman 3–0
 Juan Martin del Potro 2–0
 Andy Murray 2–0
 Stan Wawrinka 2–0
 Mariano Puerta 1–0
 Casper Ruud 1–0
 Alexander Zverev 1–0

References 

Rafael Nadal
French Open